Bernhard Sigmund Schultze; sometimes spelled Bernhard Sigismund Schultze (29 December 1827 in Freiburg im Breisgau – 17 April 1919) was a German obstetrician and gynecologist. He was a younger brother to anatomist Max Schultze (1825–1874).

In 1851 he received his medical doctorate from the University of Greifswald, where in 1853 he became a lecturer on anatomy and physiology. During the following year, he became an assistant to Dietrich Wilhelm Heinrich Busch (1788–1858) at the University Women's Hospital in Berlin, and in 1858 relocated to the University of Jena as chair of the gynecological clinic. In 1864/65 he served as rector of the university.

Family 
 Leonhard Schultze-Jena (son), an explorer, zoologist, and anthropologist

Medical eponyms 
His name is associated with an obstetrical term known as "Schultze's method", which is a resuscitation technique used on an apparent stillborn child. Other eponyms associated with Schultze include:
 Schultze-Chvostek sign: A sign of tetany seen in hypocalcemia, commonly referred to as Chvostek's sign.
 Schultze's fold: A crescent-shaped amniotic fold.
 Schultze's placenta: A placenta expelled with the central portion in advance of the periphery.

Selected writings 
 Lehrbuch der Hebammenkunst (Textbook of midwifery), 1860.
 Das Nabelbläschen, ein constantes Gebilde in der Nachgeburt des ausgetragenen Kindes (The umbilical vesicle, a constant entity in the post-birth of the discharged child).
 Der Scheintod Neugeborner (The apparent death of the newborn), 1871.
 Ueber die Lageveränderungen der Gebärmutter (Overall situational changes in the uterus), 1873.
 Unser Hebammenwesen und das Kindbettfieber (Midwifery care and puerperal fever), 1884.

References 
 "This article is based on a translation of text from an equivalent article at the German Wikipedia, its sources including Biographisches Lexikon hervorragender Ärzte des neunzehnten Jahrhunderts. Verlag Urban und Schwarzenberg, Berlin/Wien 1901, 1551–1553.
 A Practical Medical Dictionary by Thomas Lathrop Stedman (definition of eponyms).

German gynaecologists
German obstetricians
Physicians from Freiburg im Breisgau
Academic staff of the University of Jena
1827 births
1919 deaths